The Fangshan Post Office is a post office in Fangshan Township, Pingtung County, Taiwan.

History
The post office was opened on 14 October 2016 as the 41st branch of Pingtung post office.

Architecture
The post office was designed resembling a shipping box with green and white exterior. It features an image of a shrike, the Chunghwa Post corrugated shopping boxes image and mangoes and onions, the local agricultural product of Fangshan. The roof features a large screen which opens up every hour. It is also powered by solar energy.

See also
 List of tourist attractions in Taiwan

References

External links

  

2016 establishments in Taiwan
Buildings and structures completed in 2016
Buildings and structures in Pingtung County
Post office buildings in Taiwan
Tourist attractions in Pingtung County